Domonique Johnson (born November 7, 1985) is a former American football cornerback. He was signed by the Denver Broncos as an undrafted free agent in 2009. He played college football at Jackson State University. Prior to transferring to Jackson State, he played at the University of Missouri.

He has also been a member of the New York Giants, Tampa Bay Buccaneers, Minnesota Vikings, Washington Redskins, Indianapolis Colts, Philadelphia Eagles, and Detroit Lions.

Professional career

2009 NFL Combine

Denver Broncos
Johnson signed with the Denver Broncos as an undrafted free agent on April 27, 2009. The Broncos waived him, but he was signed to the team's practice squad on September 6.

New York Giants
The New York Giants signed Johnson off the Broncos' practice squad on November 11, 2009. He made his NFL debut in Week 15 against the Washington Redskins, where he recorded two tackles. He played a total of 3 games his rookie season, recording six combined tackles.

He was re-signed by the Giants on April 16, 2010. He played seven games for the Giants before being released on November 20.

Tampa Bay Buccaneers
On November 24, 2010, the Tampa Bay Buccaneers signed Johnson. He was promoted to the team's active roster on December 8.

He was released by the Buccaneers on September 5, 2011 for final roster cuts before the start of the 2011 season.

Minnesota Vikings
Johnson was signed to the Minnesota Vikings' practice squad on September 7, 2011.

Washington Redskins
The Washington Redskins signed him off of the Vikings' practice squad on November 8, 2011. He was released on November 29 by the Redskins.

Philadelphia Eagles
Johnson was signed to the practice squad of the Philadelphia Eagles on December 2. At the conclusion of the 2011 season, his practice squad contract expired and he became a free agent. He was re-signed to the active roster on January 2, 2012.

Indianapolis Colts
On July 22, 2012, the Eagles traded Johnson to the Indianapolis Colts for defensive tackle Ollie Ogbu.

The Colts waived him on September 1, 2012, but signed to the team's practice squad the next day. He was waived by the team on October 1.

Second Stint with Redskins
Johnson re-joined the Redskins on October 23, 2012 after the team signed him to the practice squad. He was activated from Redskins' practice squad on November 6. He was placed on the injured reserve list on January 4, 2013 after spraining a ligament in his left knee in the last regular season game against the Dallas Cowboys

The Redskins released Johnson on February 4.

Detroit Lions
Johnson was signed to the Detroit Lions on February 6, 2013. On August 23, 2013, he was cut by the Lions.

Post-NFL Career
Current, Johnson is an assistant high school football coach for the Dickinson Gators, a neighboring district just to the north of where he grew up in La Marque, Texas.

References

External links
Edmonton Eskimos bio 
Indianapolis Colts bio
Philadelphia Eagles bio
Jackson State Tigers bio
Missouri Tigers bio

1985 births
Living people
American football cornerbacks
Denver Broncos players
Edmonton Elks players
Indianapolis Colts players
Jackson State Tigers football players
Minnesota Vikings players
Missouri Tigers football players
New York Giants players
People from Texas City, Texas
Philadelphia Eagles players
Players of American football from Texas
Tampa Bay Buccaneers players
Washington Redskins players